Eugène Eschassériaux (25 July 1823, Thénac, Charente-Maritime – 31 August 1906) was a French Bonapartist politician. He was a member of the National Legislative Assembly from 1849 to 1851, of the Corps législatif from 1852 to 1870, of the National Assembly from 1871 to 1876 and of the Chamber of Deputies from 1876 to 1893. He sat with the Appel au peuple parliamentary group.

He also carried out archaeological investigations around Thénac.

References

1823 births
1906 deaths
People from Charente-Maritime
Politicians from Nouvelle-Aquitaine
Appel au peuple
Members of the National Legislative Assembly of the French Second Republic
Members of the 1st Corps législatif of the Second French Empire
Members of the 2nd Corps législatif of the Second French Empire
Members of the 3rd Corps législatif of the Second French Empire
Members of the 4th Corps législatif of the Second French Empire
Members of the National Assembly (1871)
Members of the 1st Chamber of Deputies of the French Third Republic
Members of the 2nd Chamber of Deputies of the French Third Republic
Members of the 3rd Chamber of Deputies of the French Third Republic
Members of the 4th Chamber of Deputies of the French Third Republic
Members of the 5th Chamber of Deputies of the French Third Republic